Michael Medina Franco (born July 9, 1986) is an American former professional boxer who competed from 2005 to 2014. He held the NABF light middleweight title.

Professional career
On March 13, 2010, Medina lost a split decision to John Duddy in Cowboys Stadium.

In December 2012, Medina beat the veteran Grady Brewer to win the NABF light middleweight title. This bout was televised by ESPN as a main event for Friday Night Fights.

References

External links

1986 births
American boxers of Mexican descent
Light-middleweight boxers
Middleweight boxers
Living people
American male boxers
Boxers from California
People from Modesto, California